Joan Hartley (1892–1984) was an American sculptor. She was a member of the Philadelphia Ten, a group of American female artists who exhibited together from 1917 to 1945. The group, eventually numbering 30 painters and sculptors, exhibited annually in Philadelphia and later had traveling exhibitions at museums throughout the East Coast and the Midwest.

Hartley attended the Pennsylvania Academy of Fine Arts.

She often served a chairwomen and committee members for exhibitions of the National Association of Women Artists.

Hartley's sculptures are on display at Brookgreen Gardens in South Carolina.

Works 
Furies  - A pair of sculptures, one male, one female,1933: Brookgreen Gardens

References

External links 
 Photograph of Joan Hartley, Peter A. Juley & Son Collection, Photograph Study Collection, Smithsonian American Art Museum
 Furies - male, one of a pair, by Joan Hartley, 1933: Brookgreen Gardens. Image from Proske, Beatrice Gilman, "Brookgreen Gardens Sculpture, volume 1," [new ed.] Brookgreen, S.C.: Brookgreen Garden, 1968, pg. 331.
 Furies - female, one of a pair, by Joan Hartley, 1933: Brookgreen Gardens. Image from Proske, Beatrice Gilman, "Brookgreen Gardens Sculpture, volume 1," [new ed.] Brookgreen, S.C.: Brookgreen Garden, 1968, pg. 331.
 National Association of Women Painters and Sculptors 36th Annual Exhibition, 1926-1926, Joan Hartley, Sculpture Chairwoman (Page 10)

20th-century American women artists
1892 births
1984 deaths
Pennsylvania Academy of the Fine Arts alumni